Passion – Sources is the second of two albums of music from Martin Scorsese's film The Last Temptation of Christ. The first album, Passion by Peter Gabriel, was released in 1989 in conjunction with the movie. Passion - Sources is a compilation of songs by various artists from Armenia, Egypt, Ethiopia, Guinea, India, Iran, Morocco, Pakistan, Senegal, and Turkey. Gabriel does not perform on the album, but produced or co-produced several tracks.

Background
In his liner notes, Gabriel describes the album as "a selection of some of the traditional music, sources of inspiration, and location recordings." The album largely eschews modern Western instruments and production techniques, and consists of studio recordings (produced at Gabriel's Real World Studios and elsewhere), location recordings made during the filming of The Last Temptation of Christ, and selections from existing sound recordings.

Track listing

Personnel

Musicians
 Dildar Hussain – tabla (1)
 Farrukh Fateh Ali Khan – harmonium (1), vocals (1)
 Asad Ali Khan – chorus (1)
 Atta Fareed – chorus (1)
 Ghulam Fareed – chorus (1)
 Mohammad Maskeen – chorus (1)
 Iqbal Naqbi – chorus (1)
 Kaukab Ali – pupil singer (1)
 Mujhid Mubarik Ali Khan – senior singer (1)
 Nusrat Fateh Ali Khan – main vocals (1)
 Shankar – double violin (2, 3), production (3)
 Baaba Maal – vocals (2)
 Peter Gabriel – arrangement (2), production (2, 7, 9–11, 14), compilation, track notes
 Zakir Hussain – tabla (3)
 Vikku Vinayakram – ghatam (3)
 Caroline – Tanbura (3)
 Kudsi Erguner – ney flute (4), production (4)
 Hossam Ramzy – tabla (5), duf (5), doholla (5), tambourine (5), production (5), additional percussion (7, 9)
 Joseph Alexander – mazhar (5)
 Richard Evans – tin whistle (7), mixing (1)
 Mahmoud Tabrizi Zadeh – kementché (8), production (8)
 Manu Katché – additional percussion (9)
 Abdul Aziz el-Sayed – kanoun (10)
 Yacouba (Bruno) Camara – conga (11), gongoma (11), arrangement (11)
 Arafan Toure – djembe (11)
 Aly Camara – djembe (11), bolon (11)
 Amara Soumah – doum-doum (11), gongoma (11)
 Naby 'Papus' Camara – small percussion (11)
 Kabine Camara – small percussion (11)
 Tagar – small percussion (11)
 Nass El Ghiwane – production (12)
 Mustafa Abdel Aziz – tabla (13)
 Said Mohammad Aly – tabla (13)
 Metqal Qenawi Metqal – rababa (13)
 Shamandi Tewfick Metqal – rababa (13)
 Mohammad Murad Metgali – rababa (13)
 Alain Weber – rababa (13)
 Les Musiciens du Nil – production (13)
 Antranik Askarian – doudouk (14)
 Khatchadour Khatchaturian – doudouk (14)

Technical personnel
 Mohammed Ayuub – production (1)
 David Bottrill – engineering (1, 2, 10, 11, 13), compilation assistance
 Alan Heaton – recording (5)
 David Knowles – recording (5)
 Tiberiu Alexandru – production (6)
 Ralph Harrison – recording (7)
 Ragnar Johnson – recording (7)
 Robert Ataian – production (14)
 The Townhouse – mastering

Charts

References

External links

Albums produced by Peter Gabriel
1989 compilation albums
1989 soundtrack albums
World music compilation albums
Real World Records compilation albums
Real World Records soundtracks
Drama film soundtracks